The 27th Daytime Emmy Awards were held in 2000 to commemorate excellence in daytime programming from the previous year (1999).

Winners in each category are in bold.

Outstanding Drama Series
All My Children
General Hospital
One Life to Live
The Young and the Restless

Outstanding Lead Actor
Peter Bergman (Jack Abbott, The Young and the Restless)
Eric Braeden (Victor Newman, The Young and the Restless)
David Canary (Adam Chandler/Stuart Chandler, All My Children)
Anthony Geary (Luke Spencer, General Hospital)
Robert S. Woods (Bo Buchanan, One Life to Live)

Outstanding Lead Actress
Jeanne Cooper (Katherine Chancellor, The Young and the Restless)
Susan Flannery (Stephanie Forrester, The Bold and the Beautiful)
Finola Hughes (Alex Devane, All My Children)
Hillary B. Smith (Nora Buchanan, One Life to Live)
Jess Walton (Jill Abbott, The Young and the Restless)

Outstanding Supporting Actor
Steve Burton (Jason Morgan, General Hospital)
Timothy Gibbs (Kevin Buchanan, One Life to Live)
Christian LeBlanc (Michael Baldwin, The Young and the Restless)
Shemar Moore (Malcolm Winters, The Young and the Restless)
Kristoff St. John (Neil Winters, The Young and the Restless)

Outstanding Supporting Actress
Sarah Brown (Carly Quartermaine, General Hospital)
Sharon Case (Sharon Newman, The Young and the Restless)
Patrika Darbo (Nancy Wesley, Days of Our Lives)
Nancy Lee Grahn (Alexis Davis, General Hospital)
Tonya Lee Williams (Olivia Winters, The Young and the Restless)

Outstanding Younger Actor
Jensen Ackles (Eric Brady, Days of Our Lives)
Jonathan Jackson (Lucky Spencer, General Hospital)
Bryant Jones (Nate Hastings, The Young and the Restless)
David Lago (Raul Guittierez, The Young and the Restless)
Joshua Morrow (Nicholas Newman, The Young and the Restless)
David Tom (Billy Abbott, The Young and the Restless)

Outstanding Younger Actress
Adrienne Frantz (Amber Moore, The Bold and the Beautiful)
Camryn Grimes (Cassie Newman, The Young and the Restless)
Ashley Jones (Megan Dennison, The Young and the Restless)
Heather Tom (Victoria Newman, The Young and the Restless)
Erin Torpey (Jessica Buchanan, One Life to Live)

Outstanding Drama Series Writing Team
As the World Turns
The Bold and the Beautiful
General Hospital
The Young and the Restless

Outstanding Drama Series Directing Team
All My Children
The Bold and the Beautiful
General Hospital
Sunset Beach
The Young and the Restless

Outstanding Game/Audience Participation Show
Hollywood Squares
Jeopardy!
The Price is Right
Who Wants to Be a Millionaire
Win Ben Stein's Money

Outstanding Game Show Host
Bob Barker, The Price is Right
Tom Bergeron, Hollywood Squares
Regis Philbin, Who Wants to Be a Millionaire
Pat Sajak, Wheel of Fortune
Alex Trebek, Jeopardy!

Outstanding Talk Show
Donny & Marie
Live with Regis and Kathie Lee
The Martin Short Show
The Rosie O'Donnell Show
The View

Outstanding Talk Show Host
Rosie O'Donnell, The Rosie O'Donnell Show
Regis Philbin and Kathie Lee Gifford, Live with Regis and Kathie Lee
Barbara Walters, Meredith Vieira, Star Jones, Joy Behar and Lisa Ling, The View
Donny Osmond and Marie Osmond, Donny & Marie
Martin Short, The Martin Short Show

Outstanding Performer In An Animated Program
James Woods (Hades, Hercules: The Animated Series)
Nathan Lane (George, George and Martha)
Pam Grier (The Nightingale, Happily Ever After: Fairy Tales for Every Child: The Empress' Nightingale)
Robert Guillaume (Narrator, Happily Ever After: Fairy Tales for Every Child: The Empress' Nightingale)
French Stewart (Icarus, Hercules: The Animated Series)

Outstanding Performer in a Children's Special
James Earl Jones (Dr. William 'Bill' Blakely, Summer's End)
Debbie Reynolds (Shirlee Allison, A Gift of Love: The Daniel Huffman Story)
Marc Donato (Stephen Locked, Locked in Silence) 
Bonnie Bedelia (Lydia, Locked in Silence)
Hume Cronyn (Mr. John McRae, Sea People)

Outstanding Sound Editing
Dave Howe, Michael McAuliffe, and Thomas McGurk (Bill Nye, the Science Guy)
Michael Ruschak, and Philippe Desloovere (30 by 30: Kid Flicks)
William H. Angarola, Mike Marchain, Anna MacKenzie, Robert Guastini, Cindy Rabideau, Ray Spiess, Rick Hinson, and Warren Smith (The Devil's Arithmetic)
Jeffrey Boydstun, Jim Perry, and Rita Egleston (The Phantom Eye)

Outstanding Sound Mixing
Peter Hefter, and John Alberts (Bear in the Big Blue House)
Dave Howe, Michael McAuliffe, Thomas McGurk, Myron Partman, and Resti Bagcal (Bill Nye, the Science Guy)
 Bill Thiederman, Dean Okrand, Mike Brooks, and Clancy Livingston (Honey, I Shrunk the Kids: The TV Show)
Robert Montrone, and Bill Baggett (Martha Stewart Living)
Richard Bock, Dan Lesiw, and Jeff Scornavacca (Zoom)

Outstanding Sound Mixing - Special Class
Benoît Coaillier (Arthur)
Fil Brown and Melissa Ellis (Men in Black: The Series)
Tom Maydeck, Robert Hargreaves and John Hegedes (Batman Beyond)
Dick Maitland and Blake Norton (Sesame Street)

Outstanding Children's Series
James McKenna, Erren Gottlieb, Elizabeth Brock, Jamie Hammond, and Bill Nye (Bill Nye, the Science Guy)
Carol Tomko Recka, John Stainton, and Judy Bailey (The Crocodile Hunter) 
Linda Ellerbee, Rolfe Tessem, Mark Lyons, and Wally Berger (Nick News with Linda Ellerbee)
Peter Engel, Bennett Tramer, Tony Soltis, Chris Conte, Paul Dell, and Steven Weiss (Saved by the Bell: The New Class)
Kate Taylor, Jonathan G. Meath, Marisa Wolsky, Jim Johnston (Zoom)

Outstanding Writing in a Children's Series
Bill Nye, Michael Gross, Darrell Suto, Ian G. Saunders, Michael Palleschi, Lynn Brunelle, and Mike Greene (Bill Nye, the Science Guy)
Angela Santomero, Adam Peltzman, Michael Smith, Alice Wilder, Jessica Lissy (Blue's Clues)
Fred Rogers (Mister Rogers' Neighborhood)
Linda Ellerbee, Walt McGraw (Nick News with Linda Ellerbee)
Lou Berger, Molly Boylan, Sara Compton, Annie Evans, Chrissy Ferraro, Judy Freudberg, Tony Geiss, Ian Ellis James, Emily Perl Kingsley, David Korr, Sonia Manzano, Joey Mazzarino, Jeff Moss, Cathi Turow, Adam Rudman, Nancy Sans, Luis Santeiro, Josh Selig, Belinda Ward, John Weidman, and Mo Willems (Sesame Street)

Outstanding Directing in a Children's Series
Nancy Keegan, Alan Zdinak, and Mitchell Kriegman (Blue's Clues)
Michael Gross, Darrell Suto, and Mitchell Kriegman (Bill Nye, the Science Guy)
 Ted May, Emily Squires, Reggie Life, Steve Feldman, Victor DiNapoli, Mitchell Kriegman (Sesame Street)
Jesse Collins, Mitchell Kriegman (Zoboomafoo)

Lifetime achievement award
 Barbara Walters

References

External links

027
Daytime Emmy Awards

it:Premi Emmy 2000#Premi Emmy per il Daytime